Athens Historic District, also known as Tioga Point Historic District, is a national historic district located at Athens, Bradford County, Pennsylvania.  The district includes 97 contributing buildings and 1 contributing site in a primarily residential area of Athens. The buildings date between about 1801 and 1935, and include notable examples of vernacular and high style Greek Revival and Queen Anne style architecture. Also located in the district are the First Presbyterian Church (1881), Trinity Episcopal Church (1860-1861), and Riverside Cemetery / Old Athens Cemetery.  Located in the district and separately listed are the Protection of the Flag Monument and Spalding Memorial Library-Tioga Point Museum.

It was added to the National Register of Historic Places in 2004.

References

Greek Revival architecture in Pennsylvania
Queen Anne architecture in Pennsylvania
Buildings and structures in Bradford County, Pennsylvania
Historic districts on the National Register of Historic Places in Pennsylvania
National Register of Historic Places in Bradford County, Pennsylvania